Mariano Puerta was the defending champion, but did not participate this year.

Daniele Bracciali defeated Nicolás Massú 6–1, 6–4, to win the 2006 Grand Prix Hassan II singles event.

Seeds

  Nicolás Massú (final)
  Luis Horna (quarterfinals)
  Christophe Rochus (quarterfinals)
  Andreas Seppi (first round)
  Arnaud Clément (second round)
  Jürgen Melzer (second round)
  Daniele Bracciali (champion)
  Gilles Simon (semifinals)

Draw

Finals

Top half

Bottom half

External links
 2006 Grand Prix Hassan II Draw
 2006 Grand Prix Hassan II Qualifying Draw

Singles
Grand Prix Hassan II